Cyperus ferrugineoviridis is a species of sedge that is native to parts of Africa.

See also 
 List of Cyperus species

References 

ferrugineoviridis
Plants described in 1936
Taxa named by Georg Kükenthal
Flora of Botswana
Flora of Burundi
Flora of Kenya
Flora of Malawi
Flora of Rwanda
Flora of Somalia
Flora of Tanzania
Flora of Uganda
Flora of Zambia
Flora of Zimbabwe